Nicolas P. Retsinas (born 1946) is an American economist who served as United States Assistant Secretary of Housing and Urban Development for Housing during the presidency of Bill Clinton. He was later director of the Joint Center for Housing Studies at Harvard University, and chair of the board of commissioners of Rhode Island Housing.

Retsinas graduated from New York University, where he studied Economics, received a Master’s degree in City Planning from Harvard University, and a Doctorate in Public Service from Rhode Island College.

References

 

New York University alumni
Harvard University alumni
Rhode Island College alumni
United States Assistant Secretaries of Housing and Urban Development
Living people
1946 births